Sigurður Einarsson (born 7 April 1943) is an Icelandic former handball player who competed in the 1972 Summer Olympics. On club level he played for Fram, Reykjavík.

References

1943 births
Living people
Sigurdur Einarsson
Sigurdur Einarsson
Handball players at the 1972 Summer Olympics